Heterodera amygdali  is a plant pathogenic nematode native to Tajikistan.

Notes

References 
Kir'yanova, E. S.; Ivanova, T. S. 1975 Izvestiya Akademii Nauk Tadzhikskoi deg SSR Ahboroti Akademijai Fanhoi RSS Rocikiston, Otdelenie Biologicheskikh Nauk (3(60)): 52-56

amygdali
Plant pathogenic nematodes
Fauna of Tajikistan
Nematodes described in 1975